The following are lists of Slovak authors:

 List of Slovak prose and drama authors
 List of Slovak poets